Ossi is a comune (municipality) in the Province of Sassari in the Italian region Sardinia, located about  northwest of Cagliari and about  southeast of Sassari in the Logudoro.

Located in the territory is a Domus de Janas, a pre-historic tomb.

References

Cities and towns in Sardinia